Sheung Tong is a village in the Tsuen Wan District of Hong Kong.

Administration
Sheung Tong is a recognized village under the New Territories Small House Policy.

See also
 Yuen Tsuen Ancient Trail

References

Villages in Tsuen Wan District, Hong Kong